Malacothrix is a genus of plants in the tribe Cichorieae within the family Asteraceae. They are known generally as desert dandelions or desertdandelions. Most are native to western North America although a few have been introduced to South America. Several are found only on offshore islands in the Pacific.

Phylogenetic analysis demonstrates that Malacothrix is not monophyletic.  Some of its species are related to Atrichoseris, whereas a second group is more closely related to Anisocoma and Calycoseris.

Species
 Malacothrix californica - California desertdandelion - CA Baja California, Baja California Sur
 Malacothrix clevelandii - Cleveland's desertdandelion - CA AZ UT Baja California
 Malacothrix coulteri - snake's head - CA NV AZ UT NM Baja California
 Malacothrix fendleri - Fendler's desertdandelion - AZ NM TX Sonora
 Malacothrix floccifera - woolly desertdandelion -  CA NV 
 Malacothrix foliosa - leafy desertdandelion -  San Clemente Island
 Malacothrix glabrata - smooth desertdandelion - CA NV AZ NM ID OR Baja California, Baja California Sur
 Malacothrix incana - dunedelion - CA 
 Malacothrix indecora - Santa Cruz Island desert-dandelion - Santa Cruz Island
 Malacothrix insularis - island desertdandelion - Coronados Island in Baja California
 Malacothrix junakii - Junak's desertdandelion - Anacapa Island
 Malacothrix phaeocarpa - Davis' desertdandelion - CA 
 Malacothrix saxatilis - cliff desertdandelion - CA 
 Malacothrix similis - twin desertdandelion - CA Baja California
 Malacothrix sonchoides - sowthistle desertdandelion - OR ID WY CO NM AZ UT NV CA 
 Malacothrix sonorae - Sonoran desertdandelion - Sonora AZ NM TX 
 Malacothrix squalida - Santa Cruz desertdandelion - Santa Cruz Island
 Malacothrix stebbinsii - Stebbins' desertdandelion - OR CA NV AZ NM UT Sonora 
 Malacothrix torreyi - Torrey's desertdandelion - CA NV AZ NM UT CO WY ID MT OR 
  Malacothrix xanthi - Baja California, Baja California Sur

References

External links
USDA PLANTS
The Jepson eFlora 2013

 
Asteraceae genera
Flora of North America